Kwaksan County is a kun ('county') in coastal southern North P'yŏngan province, North Korea.  It faces the Yellow Sea to the south. By land, it is bordered by Kusŏng city in the north, Chŏngju in the east, and Sŏnch'ŏn in the west.

Geography
Numerous small rivers meet the sea in Kwaksan, including the Tongrae, Sasŏng, and Sach'ŏn.  There are 15 islands off the coast, which measures  in total. Forestland occupies 46.5% of the county's area, and is 80% pine; cultivated land occupies 30% of the area, and is 50% rice paddies.

Administrative divisions
Kwaksan county is divided into 1 ŭp (town) and 19 ri (villages):

Climate

Economy
The chief crops are rice, maize, apples, and peaches. Silkworms and livestock are also raised, and fishing also contributes to the local economy.

Transportation
The P'yŏngŭi Line of the Korean State Railway passes through the county on its way between P'yŏngyang and Sinŭiju.

Places of interest
Local attractions include a five-story stone pagoda dating from the Koryŏ period in Wŏnha-ri, and the Rŭngsan fortress, established in 996 by the general Sŏ Hŭi.

The only institution of higher learning in the county is a technical school.

See also
Geography of North Korea
Administrative divisions of North Korea
North Pyongan

References

External links

Counties of North Pyongan